The Lincoln Memorial Reflecting Pool is the largest of the many reflecting pools in Washington, D.C., United States. It is a long and large rectangular pool located on the National Mall, directly east of the Lincoln Memorial, with the Washington Monument to the east of the reflecting pool. Part of the iconic image of Washington, the reflecting pool hosts many of the 24 million visitors a year who visit the National Mall. It is lined by walking paths and shade trees on both sides. Depending on the viewer's vantage point, it dramatically reflects the Washington Monument, the Lincoln Memorial, the Mall's trees, and/or the expansive sky.

Description
The Lincoln Memorial Reflecting Pool was designed by Henry Bacon, and was constructed in 1922 and 1923, following the dedication of the Lincoln Memorial. The perimeter of the pool is therefore  around.

Restoration
Using funding from the American Recovery and Reinvestment Act of 2009, the National Park Service reconstructed the Lincoln Memorial Reflecting Pool. The pool's water supply system was updated to eliminate stagnant water by circulating water from the Tidal Basin; the pool was formerly filled using potable water from the city. Paved walking paths were added to the north and south sides of the pool to replace worn grass and to prevent further erosion. Construction on the 18-month, $30.74 million project began in November 2010. In May 2011, workers began sinking the first of 2,113 wood pilings into a  layer of soft, marshy river clay and some dredged material atop bedrock to support a new pool. The pool reopened on August 31, 2012. The project was managed by the Louis Berger Group.

Post-restoration operation
Within weeks of the pool's reopening in 2012, it had to be drained and cleaned at a cost of $100,000 due to algae in the pool. The algae growth was so extensive it almost completely covered the surface of the pool. Using an ozone disinfectant system installed during the renovation, the National Park Service said it would double the amount of algae-killing ozone in the pool to control future outbreaks.

In 2013, construction on the National World War II Memorial damaged the eastern end of the Reflecting Pool. NPS workers closed the eastern  of the pool in August 2015 to repair the basin, work that was completed in the summer of 2016.

The Reflecting Pool was completely drained in June 2017 to control a parasitical outbreak. The parasite, which causes swimmer's itch, infects snails which inhabit the pool. More than 80 ducks and ducklings have died at the pool due to parasitical infection since May 20. Park Service workers said the work and refilling of the pool would take 10 days.

Historic events

Located at the base of the Lincoln Memorial's steps, the Reflecting Pool area has been the site of many historic events, including:
In 1939, singer Marian Anderson was denied permission to perform at Constitution Hall in Washington because she was African American. An open-air concert was held on Easter Sunday, with a crowd of over 75,000 people.
On August 28, 1963, the March on Washington for Jobs and Freedom used the area for its Civil Rights rally. It was there that Martin Luther King Jr. gave his "I Have a Dream" speech, delivered to a crowd of 250,000 people.
On October 21, 1967, 100,000 anti-Vietnam War protesters met at the pool and memorial to begin the March on the Pentagon.
In 2009, We Are One: The Obama Inaugural Celebration at the Lincoln Memorial was held, with a crowd of 400,000 people.
In 2010, the restoration project began.
On August 28, 2010, the Restoring Honor rally was held. Notable speakers included Alveda King, the niece of Martin Luther King Jr., former vice presidential candidate Gov. Sarah Palin and the event's organizer Glenn Beck. 
As of 2012, the restoration project was completed and the pool was reopened on August 31.
On December 31, 2012, National Park Rangers, using their personal funds and time, lit over 2,000 candles around the reflecting pool in commemoration of the 150th anniversary of the Emancipation Proclamation, where the Park Service rang in the New Year with a Night Watch and Freedom Vigil and the singing of "My Country, 'Tis of Thee."
On August 28, 2013, the 50th anniversary of the March on Washington for Jobs and Freedom and Martin Luther King Jr.'s "I Have A Dream" speech was commemorated by an all-day event. The event featured various speakers including then President Barack Obama and John Lewis, the only living speaker from the original rally.
On January 19, 2021, then President-elect Joe Biden and then Vice President-elect Kamala Harris held a memorial honoring the 400,000 Americans who had died in the COVID-19 pandemic in the United States.

Gallery

See also
 Capitol Reflecting Pool
 Rainbow Pool

References

External links 

 Photos of the Lincoln Memorial Reflecting Pool
 NBC Washington: Changes Planned for Lincoln Memorial, Reflecting Pool

National Mall
Fountains in Washington, D.C.
Ponds of the United States
Monuments and memorials to Abraham Lincoln in the United States
1923 establishments in Washington, D.C.